The Ministry of the Interior of Argentina is a ministry of the national executive power that manages issues pertaining to domestic politics such as immigration and co-ordination between the federal government and the governments of the provinces of Argentina.

The Ministry of the Interior is one of the oldest ministries in the Argentine government, having existed continuously since the formation of the first Argentine executive in 1854, in the presidency of Justo José de Urquiza. The incumbent minister is Eduardo de Pedro, who has served since 10 December 2019 in the cabinet of Alberto Fernández.

History
The Ministry of the Interior was one of the first five cabinet ministries formed by the first president of the Argentine Confederation, Justo José de Urquiza, upon his ascension to the presidency on 5 March 1854. The first interior minister was Benjamín Gorostiaga. The name of the ministry remained unchanged for over a century until the presidency of Juan Domingo Perón, when it was merged with the Justice portfolio under the administration of Ángel Borlenghi.

The military administration of Eduardo Lonardi restored the ministry its former name in 1955, and it wasn't until 2012 during the presidency of Cristina Fernández de Kirchner that an additional portfolio, this time that of the transport ministry, was incorporated into the Interior portfolio. The successive administration of Mauricio Macri added further responsibilities, merging the ministry with public works and housing.

In 2019, President Alberto Fernández reorganized the cabinet ministries and separated the public works and housing responsibilities from the Interior Ministry, rendering back to its original name again.

Attributions and structure
Article 17 of the current Law on Ministries, adopted in 2019, lays out the purported attributions and responsibilities of the Ministry of the Interior of Argentina. According to the law, it is within the Ministry's responsibilities to assist the President and the Chief of Cabinet on all matters pertaining to the internal governance and the exercise of principles and constitutional guarantees, safekeeping the republican, representative and federal government.

Some particular issues that are within the ministry's jurisdiction include judging on when it is pertinent to declare a state of siege; dealing with proposals of constitutional reform and organizing constitutional conventions when it is necessary; and maintaining a state of co-operation between the governments of the provinces of Argentina and the Autonomous City of Buenos Aires, including inter-jurisdictional matters and relations, and coordinating policies that help and promote regional growth.

Structure and dependencies
The Ministry of the Interior counts with a number of centralized and decentralized dependencies. The centralized dependencies, as in other government ministers, are known as secretariats (secretarías) and undersecretariats (subsecretarías); there are currently three of these:
Secretariat of the Interior (Secretaría del Interior)
Undersecretariat of the Interior (Subsecretaría del Interior)
Secretariat of Provinces (Secretaría de Provincias)
Undersecretariat of Provincial Relations (Subsecretaría de Relaciones con Provincias)
Undersecretariat of Development Policies with Regional Equality (Subsecretaría de Políticas para el Desarrollo con Equidad Regional)
Secretariat of Municipalities (Secretaría de Municipios)
Undersecretariat of Municipal Relations (Subsecretaría de Relaciones Municipales)
Secretariat of Political Affairs (Secretaría de Asuntos Políticos)
National Institute for Political Training (Instituto Nacional de Capacitación Política)

Several decentralized agencies also report to the Ministry of the Interior, such as the National Directorate for Migration (Dirección Nacional de Migraciones; DNM), the National Persons Registry (Registro Nacional de las Personas, Renaper), and the General Archive of the Nation.

Headquarters

The Ministry of the Interior is headquartered at 25 de Mayo Avenue 101, in the San Nicolás barrio in Buenos Aires. The building originally housed the headquarters of the Central Argentine Railway.

List of ministers

See also
 Ministries of the Argentine Republic
 Immigration to Argentina

References

External links
 

Interior
Internal affairs ministries
1854 establishments in Argentina
Ministries established in 1854